1964 Olympics refers to both:

The 1964 Winter Olympics, which were held in Innsbruck, Austria
The 1964 Summer Olympics, which were held in Tokyo, Japan